This is a partial chronological list of cases decided by the United States Supreme Court decided during the Chase Court, the tenure of Chief Justice Salmon P. Chase from December 15, 1864 through May 7, 1873.

References

External links

Chase
List